Manuela Maleeva-Fragniere was the defending champion but did not compete that year.

Sabine Appelmans won in the final 6–1, 4–6, 7–6 against Meike Babel.

Seeds
A champion seed is indicated in bold text while text in italics indicates the round in which that seed was eliminated.

  Anke Huber (quarterfinals)
  Mary Pierce (first round)
  Katerina Maleeva (first round)
  Leila Meskhi (quarterfinals)
  Sabine Appelmans (champion)
  Meike Babel (final)
  Sandra Cecchini (quarterfinals)
  Laura Golarsa (first round)

Draw

External links
 1994 EA-Generali Ladies Linz Draw

1994 WTA Tour